Ernesto Schiaparelli (July 12, 1856 – February 14, 1928) was an Italian Egyptologist.

Biography

He was born in Occhieppo Inferiore (Biella). He found  Queen Nefertari's tomb in Deir el-Medina in the Valley of the Queens (1904) and excavated the TT8 tomb of the royal architect Kha (1906), found intact and displayed in toto in Turin. He was appointed director of the Egyptian Museum in Florence, where he professionally reorganized the collection in new quarters in 1880, then at the peak of his career was made director of the Museo Egizio di Torino, which became with him and his many seasons of excavating, the second biggest Egyptian museum in the world. He was the author of famous scholarly works and a Senator of the Kingdom of Italy. At the same time, he was deeply involved, from his first stay with Franciscan missionaries at Luxor in 1884, with relieving the poverty he saw among the missionaries of Upper Egypt, for whom he founded the Association to Succour Italian Missionaries (ANSMI), which expanded its work to care for Italian emigrants throughout the Near East.

Schiaparelli was from a distinguished family of scholars. His father Luigi Schiaparelli taught history at the University of Turin. Giovanni Virginio Schiaparelli, the famous astronomer,  Celestino, the Arabist, Cesare, the pioneer of photography, Carlo Felice, the agronomist, Giovanni Battista, a pioneer of industrial chemistry and Elsa Schiaparelli, one of the most prominent figures in fashion between the two World Wars were among his kin.

Between 1903 and 1920 Schiaparelli undertook twelve archaeological campaigns, opening sites in Heliopolis, the cemeteries of Giza, Hermopolis, Assiut, Qaw el-Kebir, Gebelein and Aswan (the tomb of Harkhuf).

In 1902 permission to excavate the Western cemetery in Giza was granted by Gaston Maspero, director of the Egyptian Antiquities Service. The area was divided into three sections, and chosen by lot. The southern section was given to the Italians under Ernesto Schiaparelli, the northern strip to the Germans under Ludwig Borchardt, and the middle section to Andrew Reisner.

Main publications
Del sentimento religioso degli Egiziani (1877)
Il Libro del Funerali degli antichi Egiziani, 3 vols. (1881-1890) On the Egyptian Book of the Dead.
Les Hypogées de Thebes (1889)
 La Tomba Intatta Dell'architetto Kha Nella Necropoli Di Tebe [The Intact Tomb of the Architect Kha in the Necropolis of Thebes] (1927)

References

External links
Schiaparelli

Gallery

Italian Egyptologists
Italian archaeologists
1856 births
1928 deaths
Directors of the Museo Egizio
20th-century archaeologists